Johan Sebastian Walldén, (born 5 February 1995) is a Swedish singer and winner of Idol 2018.

He competed in the final against Kadiatou Holm Keita in Globen on 7 December that year. He has earlier participated as a contestant on Paradise Hotel: Förspelet, broadcast on TV3, where he competed for a place as a contestants on the Swedish version of Paradise Hotel, but he did not win a spot.

Walldén is openly gay.

Singles

References

External links 
 
 
 
 

Living people
1995 births
People from Gothenburg
Idol (Swedish TV series) participants
Idol (Swedish TV series) winners
Swedish LGBT singers
Swedish gay musicians
Gay singers
21st-century Swedish male singers
20th-century Swedish LGBT people
21st-century Swedish LGBT people